Women's Combined World Cup 2004/2005

Final point standings

In Women's Combined World Cup 2004/05 only one competition was held.

Note:

Not all points were awarded (not enough finishers).

Women's Combined Team Results
bold indicate highest score - italics indicate race win

References

External links
 

World Cup
FIS Alpine Ski World Cup women's combined discipline titles